Erling Fredriksfryd (7 February 1905 – 17 January 1977) was a Norwegian politician for the Conservative Party.

He was born in Idd.

He was elected to the Norwegian Parliament from the Market towns of Østfold and Akershus in 1945, and was re-elected on four occasions.

Fredriksfryd was also involved in local politics in Halden city.

References

1905 births
1977 deaths
Conservative Party (Norway) politicians
Members of the Storting
20th-century Norwegian politicians